This article lists described species of the family Asilidae start with letter N.

A
B
C
D
E
F
G
H
I
J
K
L
M
N
O
P
Q
R
S
T
U
V
W
Y
Z

List of Species

Genus Nannocyrtopogon
 Nannocyrtopogon antennatus (Wilcox & Martin, 1957)
 Nannocyrtopogon aristatus (James, 1942)
 Nannocyrtopogon arnaudi (Wilcox & Martin, 1957)
 Nannocyrtopogon atripes (Wilcox & Martin, 1936)
 Nannocyrtopogon bruneri (Wilcox & Martin, 1957)
 Nannocyrtopogon cerussatus (Osten-Sacken, 1877)
 Nannocyrtopogon crumbi (Wilcox & Martin, 1957)
 Nannocyrtopogon deserti (Wilcox & Martin, 1957)
 Nannocyrtopogon howlandi (Wilcox & Martin, 1957)
 Nannocyrtopogon inyoi (Wilcox & Martin, 1957)
 Nannocyrtopogon irwini (Wilcox & Martin, 1957)
 Nannocyrtopogon jbeameri (Wilcox & Martin, 1957)
 Nannocyrtopogon lestomyiformis (Wilcox & Martin, 1936)
 Nannocyrtopogon mingusi (Wilcox & Martin, 1957)
 Nannocyrtopogon minutus (Wilcox & Martin, 1936)
 Nannocyrtopogon monrovia (Wilcox & Martin, 1936)
 Nannocyrtopogon neoculatus (Wilcox & Martin, 1957)
 Nannocyrtopogon nevadensis (Wilcox & Martin, 1957)
 Nannocyrtopogon nigricolor (Coquillett, 1904)
 Nannocyrtopogon nitidus (Wilcox & Martin, 1957)
 Nannocyrtopogon oculatus (Wilcox & Martin, 1936)
 Nannocyrtopogon richardsoni (Wilcox & Martin, 1957)
 Nannocyrtopogon sequoia (Wilcox & Martin, 1957)
 Nannocyrtopogon stonei (Wilcox & Martin, 1957)
 Nannocyrtopogon timberlakei (Wilcox & Martin, 1957)
 Nannocyrtopogon tolandi (Wilcox & Martin, 1957)
 Nannocyrtopogon vanduzeei (Wilcox & Martin, 1936)
 Nannocyrtopogon vandykei (Wilcox & Martin, 1957)

Genus Nannodioctria
 Nannodioctria lopatini (Lehr, 1965)
 Nannodioctria seminole (Bromley, 1924)

Genus Negasilus
 Negasilus belli (Curran, 1934)
 Negasilus gramalis (Adisoemarto, 1967)

Genus Neocyrtopogon
 Neocyrtopogon bifasciatus (Ricardo, 1912)

Genus Neodioctria
 Neodioctria australis (Ricardo, 1918)

Genus Neodiogmites
 Neodiogmites alexanderi (Carrera, 1949)
 Neodiogmites atriapex (Carrera & Papavero, 1962)
 Neodiogmites carrerai (Artigas & Papavero, 1988)
 Neodiogmites hirtuosus (Wiedemann, 1821)
 Neodiogmites lanei (Carrera, 1949)
 Neodiogmites tauauna (Artigas & Papavero, 1988)
 Neodiogmites tenebrosus (Carrera, 1949)

Genus Neoepitriptus
 Neoepitriptus minusculus (Bezzi, 1898)
 Neoepitriptus ninae (Lehr, 1992)

Genus Neoholopogon
 Neoholopogon loewi (Joseph & Parui, 1989)

Genus Neoitamus
 Neoitamus affinis (Williston, 1893)
 Neoitamus angusticornis (Loew, 1858)
 Neoitamus aurifer (Hermann, 1917)
 Neoitamus barsilensis (Joseph & Parui, 1984)
 Neoitamus belokobylskii (Lehr, 1999)
 Neoitamus bengalensis (Joseph & Parui, 1981)
 Neoitamus brevicomus (Hine, 1909)
 Neoitamus calcuttaensis (Joseph & Parui, 1986)
 Neoitamus castaneipennis (Tagawa, 1981)
 Neoitamus castellanii (Hradský, 1956)
 Neoitamus coquillettii (Hine, 1909)
 Neoitamus cyaneocinctus (Pandellé, 1905)
 Neoitamus dhenkundensis (Joseph & Parui, 1987)
 Neoitamus dolichurus (Becker, 1925)
 Neoitamus fertilis (Becker, 1925)
 Neoitamus grahami (Joseph & Parui, 1986)
 Neoitamus hardyi (Bromley, 1938)
 Neoitamus himalayensis (Joseph & Parui, 1984)
 Neoitamus hyalipennis (Ricardo, 1913)
 Neoitamus impudicus (Gerstaecker, 1862)
 Neoitamus ishiharai (Tagawa, 1981)
 Neoitamus javanensis (Meijere, 1913)
 Neoitamus khasiensis (Bromley, 1935)
 Neoitamus lascus (Walker, 1849)
 Neoitamus leucopogon (Meijere, 1913)
 Neoitamus maculatoides (Hardy, 1920)
 Neoitamus melanopogon (Schiner, 1868)
 Neoitamus meridionalis (Hutton, 1901)
 Neoitamus mussooriensis (Joseph & Parui, 1984)
 Neoitamus navasardiani (Richter, 1963)
 Neoitamus pediformis (Becker, 1925)
 Neoitamus planiceps (Schiner, 1868)
 Neoitamus potanini (Lehr, 1966)
 Neoitamus richterievi (Esipenko, 1972)
 Neoitamus rubripes (Hermann, 1917)
 Neoitamus rubrofemoratus (Ricardo, 1919)
 Neoitamus rudis (Walker, 1855)
 Neoitamus sedlaceki (Joseph & Parui, 1987)
 Neoitamus setifemur (Lehr, 1966)
 Neoitamus smithii (Hutton, 1901)
 Neoitamus socius (Loew, 1871)
 Neoitamus splendidus (Oldenberg, 1912)
 Neoitamus terminalis (Hine, 1909)
 Neoitamus tropicus (Ricardo, 1919)
 Neoitamus tumulus (Tomasovic, 1999)
 Neoitamus veris (Esipenko, 1974)

Genus Neolophonotus
 Neolophonotus acrolophus (Londt, 1988)
 Neolophonotus acrophilia (Londt, 1988)
 Neolophonotus acuminatus (Londt, 1985)
 Neolophonotus agrestis (Londt, 1985)
 Neolophonotus aktites (Londt, 1985)
 Neolophonotus albibarbis (Macquart, 1846)
 Neolophonotus albocuneatus (Hull, 1967)
 Neolophonotus albopilosus (Ricardo, 1920)
 Neolophonotus albovittatus (Schiner, 1867)
 Neolophonotus albus (Loew, 1858)
 Neolophonotus algidus (Londt, 1988)
 Neolophonotus amplus (Londt, 1985)
 Neolophonotus anatolicus (Londt, 1988)
 Neolophonotus anguicolis (Londt, 1985)
 Neolophonotus angustibarbus (Loew, 1858)
 Neolophonotus annae (Londt, 1988)
 Neolophonotus annettae (Londt, 1988)
 Neolophonotus anomalus (Londt, 1986)
 Neolophonotus antidasophrys (Londt, 1986)
 Neolophonotus arboreus (Londt, 1988)
 Neolophonotus argyphus (Londt, 1988)
 Neolophonotus atopus (Londt, 1986)
 Neolophonotus atrox (Londt, 1988)
 Neolophonotus attenuatus (Hull, 1967)
 Neolophonotus aureolocus (Londt, 1988)
 Neolophonotus ausensis (Londt, 1985)
 Neolophonotus avus (Londt, 1988)
 Neolophonotus baeoura (Londt, 1988)
 Neolophonotus bamptoni (Londt, 1987)
 Neolophonotus bezzi (Londt, 1986)
 Neolophonotus bicuspis (Londt, 1985)
 Neolophonotus bigoti (Londt, 1988)
 Neolophonotus bimaculatus (Londt, 1986)
 Neolophonotus boa (Londt, 1988)
 Neolophonotus botswana (Londt, 1988)
 Neolophonotus braunsi (Londt, 1986)
 Neolophonotus brendani (Londt, 1988)
 Neolophonotus breonii (Macquart, 1838)
 Neolophonotus brevicauda (Londt, 1985)
 Neolophonotus bromleyi (Londt, 1987)
 Neolophonotus brunales (Londt, 1988)
 Neolophonotus carnifex (Londt, 1988)
 Neolophonotus carorum (Londt, 1986)
 Neolophonotus chaineyi (Londt, 1986)
 Neolophonotus chionthrix (Hull, 1967)
 Neolophonotus chrysopylus (Londt, 1988)
 Neolophonotus chubbii (Bromley, 1947)
 Neolophonotus circus (Londt, 1988)
 Neolophonotus clavulus (Londt, 1988)
 Neolophonotus coetzeei (Londt, 1985)
 Neolophonotus colubris (Londt, 1988)
 Neolophonotus congoensis (Ricardo, 1920)
 Neolophonotus coronatus (Londt, 1987)
 Neolophonotus costatus (Londt, 1988)
 Neolophonotus crassicolis (Londt, 1985)
 Neolophonotus crassifemoralis (Londt, 1986)
 Neolophonotus crenulatus (Londt, 1985)
 Neolophonotus crinitus (Londt, 1986)
 Neolophonotus cristatus (Londt, 1988)
 Neolophonotus culinarius (Londt, 1985)
 Neolophonotus currani (Londt, 1988)
 Neolophonotus cuthbertsoni (Curran, 1934)
 Neolophonotus cymbius (Londt, 1988)
 Neolophonotus cynthiae (Londt, 1988)
 Neolophonotus declivicauda (Londt, 1988)
 Neolophonotus depilis (Londt, 1986)
 Neolophonotus destructor (Londt, 1988)
 Neolophonotus diana (Londt, 1988)
 Neolophonotus dichaetus (Hull, 1967)
 Neolophonotus dolabratus (Londt, 1988)
 Neolophonotus dondoensis (Londt, 1986)
 Neolophonotus dubius (Bezzi, 1892)
 Neolophonotus dysmicus (Londt, 1988)
 Neolophonotus elgon (Oldroyd, 1939)
 Neolophonotus ellenbergeri (Londt, 1988)
 Neolophonotus engeli (Londt, 1988)
 Neolophonotus ensiculus (Londt, 1987)
 Neolophonotus erythracanthus (Hermann, 1907)
 Neolophonotus expandocolis (Londt, 1985)
 Neolophonotus feijeni (Londt, 1988)
 Neolophonotus fimbriatus (Hull, 1967)
 Neolophonotus floccus (Londt, 1987)
 Neolophonotus forcipatus (Macquart, 1838)
 Neolophonotus fumosus (Londt, 1988)
 Neolophonotus gemsbock (Bromley, 1936)
 Neolophonotus genitalis (Ricardo, 1925)
 Neolophonotus gertrudae (Londt, 1985)
 Neolophonotus gilvipilosus (Londt, 1988)
 Neolophonotus gorongoza (Londt, 1988)
 Neolophonotus gravicauda (Londt, 1988)
 Neolophonotus grossus (Bromley, 1936)
 Neolophonotus haplotherates (Londt, 1987)
 Neolophonotus hara (Londt, 1986)
 Neolophonotus hessei (Londt, 1986)
 Neolophonotus hilaryae (Londt, 1988)
 Neolophonotus hirsutus (Ricardo, 1920)
 Neolophonotus hirtipes (Ricardo, 1920)
 Neolophonotus hobbyi (Londt, 1988)
 Neolophonotus holmi (Londt, 1988)
 Neolophonotus holoxanthus (Engel, 1927)
 Neolophonotus hulli (Londt, 1988)
 Neolophonotus hymenotelus (Londt, 1988)
 Neolophonotus indicus (Bromley, 1935)
 Neolophonotus io (Londt, 1986)
 Neolophonotus iota (Londt, 1988)
 Neolophonotus irwini (Londt, 1986)
 Neolophonotus isse (Walker, 1849)
 Neolophonotus jubatus (Londt, 1988)
 Neolophonotus junodi (Londt, 1985)
 Neolophonotus kalahari (Londt, 1985)
 Neolophonotus karooensis (Londt, 1987)
 Neolophonotus kerteszi (Londt, 1988)
 Neolophonotus kolochaetes (Londt, 1986)
 Neolophonotus ktenistus (Londt, 1986)
 Neolophonotus labeonis (Londt, 1988)
 Neolophonotus lacustrinus (Londt, 1988)
 Neolophonotus ladon (Walker, 1849)
 Neolophonotus lasius (Londt, 1988)
 Neolophonotus lawrencei (Londt, 1985)
 Neolophonotus leechi (Londt, 1988)
 Neolophonotus leptostylus (Londt, 1988)
 Neolophonotus leucodiadema (Londt, 1988)
 Neolophonotus leucopygus (Engel, 1927)
 Neolophonotus leucotaenia (Bezzi, 1906)
 Neolophonotus leucothrix (Londt, 1985)
 Neolophonotus lightfooti (Londt, 1986)
 Neolophonotus lindneri (Londt, 1988)
 Neolophonotus loewi (Londt, 1988)
 Neolophonotus loganius (Londt, 1988)
 Neolophonotus longicauda (Londt, 1988)
 Neolophonotus louisi (Londt, 1986)
 Neolophonotus macquarti (Londt, 1986)
 Neolophonotus macrocerus (Londt, 1985)
 Neolophonotus macromystax (Londt, 1986)
 Neolophonotus maculipennis (Lindner, 1955)
 Neolophonotus mafingaensisy (Londt, 1988)
 Neolophonotus malawi (Londt, 1988)
 Neolophonotus manselli (Londt, 1986)
 Neolophonotus margaracta (Londt, 1988)
 Neolophonotus marshalli (Hobby, 1934)
 Neolophonotus mediolocus (Londt, 1988)
 Neolophonotus megaphallus (Londt, 1987)
 Neolophonotus meiswinkeli (Londt, 1988)
 Neolophonotus melanoura (Londt, 1988)
 Neolophonotus melinus (Londt, 1987)
 Neolophonotus membrana (Londt, 1987)
 Neolophonotus membraneus (Londt, 1988)
 Neolophonotus mesotopus (Londt, 1988)
 Neolophonotus midas (Londt, 1988)
 Neolophonotus milleri (Londt, 1985)
 Neolophonotus milvus (Londt, 1988)
 Neolophonotus minutus (Hull, 1967)
 Neolophonotus molestus (Londt, 1988)
 Neolophonotus montanus (Ricardo, 1920)
 Neolophonotus munroi (Londt, 1987)
 Neolophonotus namaqua (Londt, 1985)
 Neolophonotus namibiensis (Londt, 1985)
 Neolophonotus nanus (Bezzi, 1906)
 Neolophonotus natalensis (Ricardo, 1920)
 Neolophonotus necator (Londt, 1988)
 Neolophonotus nero (Londt, 1988)
 Neolophonotus nigripes (Ricardo, 1920)
 Neolophonotus nigriseta (Londt, 1985)
 Neolophonotus nisus (Londt, 1988)
 Neolophonotus niveus (Londt, 1987)
 Neolophonotus nodus (Londt, 1988)
 Neolophonotus notius (Londt, 1988)
 Neolophonotus obtectocolis (Londt, 1985)
 Neolophonotus occesilitus (Londt, 1987)
 Neolophonotus occidualis (Londt, 1988)
 Neolophonotus ochrochaetus (Hull, 1967)
 Neolophonotus oldroydi (Londt, 1988)
 Neolophonotus orientalis (Ricardo, 1920)
 Neolophonotus pachystylus (Londt, 1988)
 Neolophonotus penrithae (Londt, 1988)
 Neolophonotus percus (Londt, 1988)
 Neolophonotus pilosus (Londt, 1986)
 Neolophonotus pinheyi (Londt, 1986)
 Neolophonotus pollex (Londt, 1987)
 Neolophonotus porcellus (Speiser, 1910)
 Neolophonotus pusillus (Londt, 1988)
 Neolophonotus quickelbergei (Londt, 1988)
 Neolophonotus ramus (Londt, 1988)
 Neolophonotus raptor (Londt, 1988)
 Neolophonotus raymondi (Londt, 1987)
 Neolophonotus rhodesii (Ricardo, 1920)
 Neolophonotus rhopalotus (Londt, 1988)
 Neolophonotus roberti (Londt, 1990)
 Neolophonotus robertsoni (Londt, 1985)
 Neolophonotus rolandi (Londt, 1985)
 Neolophonotus rossi (Londt, 1986)
 Neolophonotus rudi (Londt, 1988)
 Neolophonotus rufus (Macquart, 1838)
 Neolophonotus salina (Londt, 1987)
 Neolophonotus sanchorus (Londt, 1987)
 Neolophonotus satanus (Londt, 1987)
 Neolophonotus saxatilus (Londt, 1988)
 Neolophonotus schalki (Londt, 1985)
 Neolophonotus schoemani (Londt, 1985)
 Neolophonotus schofieldi (Londt, 1988)
 Neolophonotus setiventris (Loew, 1858)
 Neolophonotus seymourae (Londt, 1986)
 Neolophonotus sicarius (Londt, 1988)
 Neolophonotus similis (Ricardo, 1920)
 Neolophonotus sinis (Londt, 1988)
 Neolophonotus sinuvena (Londt, 1987)
 Neolophonotus somali (Londt, 1990)
 Neolophonotus soutpanensis (Londt, 1986)
 Neolophonotus spinicaudata (Londt, 1985)
 Neolophonotus spinosus (Londt, 1988)
 Neolophonotus spoliator (Londt, 1987)
 Neolophonotus squamosus (Londt, 1985)
 Neolophonotus stevensoni (Londt, 1985)
 Neolophonotus struthaulon (Londt, 1987)
 Neolophonotus stuckenbergi (Londt, 1986)
 Neolophonotus swaensis (Londt, 1985)
 Neolophonotus tanymedus (Londt, 1986)
 Neolophonotus theroni (Londt, 1985)
 Neolophonotus tibialis (Macquart, 1838)
 Neolophonotus torridus (Londt, 1985)
 Neolophonotus tribulosus (Londt, 1988)
 Neolophonotus trilobius (Londt, 1985)
 Neolophonotus truncatus (Londt, 1985)
 Neolophonotus umbrivena (Londt, 1987)
 Neolophonotus uncinus (Londt, 1988)
 Neolophonotus unicalamus (Londt, 1987)
 Neolophonotus vansoni (Bromley, 1936)
 Neolophonotus variabilis (Londt, 1986)
 Neolophonotus variegatus (Londt, 1988)
 Neolophonotus vermiculatus (Londt, 1988)
 Neolophonotus vincenti (Londt, 1988)
 Neolophonotus virescens (Engel, 1927)
 [[Neolophonotus Walkeri]] (Londt, 1988)
 Neolophonotus wiedemanni (Londt, 1988)
 Neolophonotus wroughtoni (Ricardo, 1920)
 Neolophonotus xanthodasus (Londt, 1988)
 Neolophonotus xiphichaetus (Hull, 1967)
 Neolophonotus zambiensis (Londt, 1986)
 Neolophonotus zigzag (Londt, 1988)
 Neolophonotus zimbabwe (Londt, 1985)
 Neolophonotus zogreus (Londt, 1986)
 Neolophonotus zopherus (Londt, 1986)
 Neolophonotus zulu (Londt, 1985)

Genus Neomochtherus
 Neomochtherus alaicus (Lehr, 1996)
 Neomochtherus albicans (Loew, 1849)
 Neomochtherus auratus (Janssens, 1968)
 Neomochtherus candidus (Becker, 1923)
 Neomochtherus corcyraeus (Tsacas, 1965)
 Neomochtherus ganvus (Wulp, 1872)
 Neomochtherus genitalis (Parui & Kaur & Kapoor, 1994)
 Neomochtherus gomerae (Weinberg & Baez, 1989)
 Neomochtherus grandicollis (Becker, 1913)
 Neomochtherus himalayensis (Joseph & Parui, 1987)
 Neomochtherus hypopygialis (Schaeffer, 1916)
 Neomochtherus idahoae (Martin, 1975)
 Neomochtherus indianus (Ricardo, 1919)
 Neomochtherus lassenae (Martin, 1975)
 Neomochtherus leclerqi (Janssens, 1968)
 Neomochtherus nudus (Bezzi, 1906)
 Neomochtherus olivierii (Macquart, 1838)
 Neomochtherus olympiae (Martin, 1975)
 Neomochtherus oregonae (Martin, 1975)
 Neomochtherus patruelis (Wulp, 1872)
 Neomochtherus pubescens (Lehr, 1996)
 Neomochtherus rothkirchii (Speiser, 1913)
 Neomochtherus rutilans (Wulp, 1898)
 Neomochtherus siculus (Macquart, 1834)
 Neomochtherus striatus (Wulp, 1891)
 Neomochtherus yasya (Lehr, 1996)

Genus Neophoneus
 Neophoneus amandus (Walker, 1849)
 Neophoneus mustela (Hermann, 1912)
 Neophoneus servillei (Macquart, 1838)

Genus Neoscleropogon
 Neoscleropogon digentius (Walker, 1849)
 Neoscleropogon emerginatus (Hardy, 1928)
 Neoscleropogon flavifacies (Macquart, 1850)
 Neoscleropogon flavipennis (White, 1918)
 Neoscleropogon nicoteles (Walker, 1849)
 Neoscleropogon thalpius (Walker, 1849)

Genus Neotes
 Neotes chiloensis (Artigas, 1970)

Genus Nerax
 Nerax abdominalis (Wiedemann, 1821)
 Nerax affinis (Bellardi, 1861)
 Nerax amazonicus (Bromley, 1934)
 Nerax apicalis (Wiedemann, 1821)
 Nerax auribarbis (Wiedemann, 1821)
 Nerax aurimystaceus (Hine, 1919)
 Nerax badiapex (Bromley, 1928)
 Nerax bardyllis (Walker, 1849)
 Nerax beameri (Wilcox, 1966)
 Nerax belfragei (Hine, 1919)
 Nerax bilineatus (Wulp, 1882)
 Nerax brunnescens (Bromley, 1929)
 Nerax camposianus (Curran, 1931)
 Nerax cazieri (Curran, 1953)
 Nerax cockerellorum (James, 1953)
 Nerax cubensis (Bromley, 1929)
 Nerax eurylabis (Wiedemann, 1828)
 Nerax femoratus (Macquart, 1838)
 Nerax flavofasciatus (Wiedemann, 1828)
 Nerax forbesi (Curran, 1931)
 Nerax fulvibarbis (Macquart, 1848)
 Nerax fuscanipennis (Macquart, 1850)
 Nerax fuscus (Wiedemann, 1828)
 Nerax gossei (Farr, 1965)
 Nerax haloesus (Walker, 1849)
 Nerax hubbelli (James, 1953)
 Nerax imbuda (Curran, 1934)
 Nerax kansensis (Hine, 1919)
 Nerax lades (Walker, 1849)
 Nerax lascivus (Wiedemann, 1828)
 Nerax macrolabis (Wiedemann, 1828)
 Nerax medianus (Wiedemann, 1828)
 Nerax mexicanus (Hine, 1919)
 Nerax nigrinus (Wiedemann, 1821)
 Nerax nigripes (Macquart, 1850)
 Nerax nigritarsis (Hine, 1919)
 Nerax obscurus (Macquart, 1838)
 Nerax parvus (Walker, 1855)
 Nerax pictipennis (Schiner, 1868)
 Nerax pilosulus (Bromley, 1929)
 Nerax poecilolamprus (James, 1953)
 Nerax portoricensis (Hine, 1919)
 Nerax pyrrhogonus (Wiedemann, 1828)
 Nerax rufipes (Macquart, 1838)
 Nerax rufithorax (Macquart, 1846)
 Nerax rufitibia (Macquart, 1848)
 Nerax slossonae (Hine, 1919)
 Nerax stigmosus (Carrera & Andretta, 1950)
 Nerax subchalybeus (Bromley, 1928)
 Nerax tabescens (Banks, 1919)
 Nerax titan (Bromley, 1934)
 Nerax tortola (Curran, 1928)
 Nerax vauriei (Curran, 1953)
 Nerax velox (Wiedemann, 1828)

Genus Nerterhaptomenus
 Nerterhaptomenus morus (Hardy, 1934)

Genus Nicocles
 Nicocles abdominalis (Williston, 1883)
 Nicocles aemulator (Loew, 1872)
 Nicocles analis (Jaennicke, 1867)
 Nicocles argentatus (Coquillett, 1893)
 Nicocles bromleyi (Hardy, 1943)
 Nicocles canadensis (Curran, 1923)
 Nicocles dives (Loew, 1866)
 Nicocles engelhardti (Wilcox, 1946)
 Nicocles lomae (Cole, 1916)
 Nicocles pollinosus (Wilcox, 1946)
 Nicocles reinhardi (Bromley, 1934)
 Nicocles rufus (Williston, 1883)

Genus Nomomyia
 Nomomyia ivetteae (Artigas, 1970)

Genus Nothopogon
 Nothopogon triangularis (Artigas & Papavero & Pimentel, 1991)

Genus Notiolaphria
 Notiolaphria africana (Londt, 1977)
 Notiolaphria macra (Bigot, 1859)

Genus Notomochtherus
 Notomochtherus brevicauda (Londt, 2002)

Genus Nusa
 Nusa aequalis (Walker, 1851)
 Nusa albibasis (Ricardo, 1927)
 Nusa andhraensis (Joseph & Parui, 1999)
 Nusa balraji (Joseph & Parui, 1999)
 Nusa bengalensis (Joseph & Parui, 1987)
 Nusa bhargavai (Joseph & Parui, 1992)
 Nusa dispar (Gerstaecker, 1871)
 Nusa elva (Walker, 1849)
 Nusa eos (Londt, 2006)
 Nusa formio (Walker, 1851)
 Nusa geniculata (Joseph & Parui, 1997)
 Nusa ghorpadei (Joseph & Parui, 1987)
 Nusa grisea (Hermann, 1914)
 Nusa indica (Joseph & Parui, 1987)
 Nusa ingwavuma (Oldroyd, 1974)
 Nusa karikalensis (Joseph & Parui, 1989)
 Nusa mukherjeei (Joseph & Parui, 1997)
 Nusa pseudoalbibasis (Joseph & Parui, 1987)
 Nusa puella (Rondani, 1873)
 Nusa pursati (Tomosovic, 2005)
 Nusa rajasthanensis (Joseph & Parui, 1992)
 Nusa ramicosa (Loew, 1871)
 Nusa sahai (Joseph & Parui, 1997)
 Nusa setosa (Joseph & Parui, 1992)
 Nusa shevaroyensis (Joseph & Parui, 1992)
 Nusa sirkari (Joseph & Parui, 1997)
 Nusa smetsi (Tomosovic, 2005)
 Nusa trianguligera (Austen, 1914)
 Nusa vari (Tomosovic, 2005)
 Nusa yerburyi (Ricardo, 1927)

Genus Nyssomyia
 Nyssomyia ochracea (Hull, 1962)

Genus Nyximyia
 Nyximyia nigra (Hull, 1962)

References 

 
Asilidae